To End All Wars is a 2001 war film starring Robert Carlyle, Kiefer Sutherland and Sakae Kimura and was directed by David L. Cunningham. The film is based on Through the Valley of the Kwai, an autobiography of Scottish captain Ernest Gordon.

Plot 
The film is set in a Japanese prisoner of war labour camp where the inmates are building the Burma Railway during the last three and a half years of World War II. Captain Ernest Gordon was a company commander with the 2nd Battalion, Argyll and Sutherland Highlanders who fought in several battles in the Malayan Campaign and the Battle of Singapore before being captured and made a prisoner of war by the Japanese.

Cast

Production
It was filmed primarily on the island of Kauai, Hawaii, with some excerpt shots of Thailand. The film was rated R in the U.S. for war violence and brutality, and for some language.  The film was produced by Jack Hafer and David Cunningham.

The screenplay is based on the autobiography of Ernest Gordon and recounts the experiences of faith and hope of the interned men. The autobiography was originally published under the name Through the Valley of the Kwai,  then later as Miracle on the River Kwai (not to be confused with the separate novel The Bridge over the River Kwai by Pierre Boulle). Gordon's book was finally re-issued with the title To End All Wars to tie in with the film.

Post-production of the film footage was delayed because of lack of funding, which was eventually provided by Gold Crest Films.

Reception
On the review aggregation website Rotten Tomatoes the film has a score of 62% based on reviews from 13 critics, with an average rating of 5.9/10. The film was awarded the Crystal Heart Award and Grand Prize for Dramatic Feature at the Heartland Film Festival.  A review in Variety is mainly negative.

Soundtrack 
The film's soundtrack was never released as a stand-alone release. Various songs have been re-recorded by Moya Brennan on her subsequent solo albums, most recently 'Mo Mhian' on My Match Is A Makin'.

References

External links

 
 
 To End All Wars at the Arts & Faith Top100 Spiritually Significant Films list
 WorldCat report

2001 films
Pacific War films
World War II prisoner of war films
Films directed by David L. Cunningham
Films scored by John Cameron
Burma Campaign films
Burma Railway
World War II films based on actual events
Films about the British Army